Cornelius "Neal" Plantinga Jr. (born 14 February 1946 in Jamestown, North Dakota) is an American theologian. He most notably served as president of Calvin Theological Seminary in Grand Rapids, Michigan from 2002 through 2011.

Plantinga received an AB degree from Calvin College in 1967, a BD degree from Calvin Theological Seminary in 1971, and a PhD degree from Princeton Theological Seminary in 1982. He is the brother of philosopher Alvin Plantinga and musicologist Leon Plantinga.

Plantinga has written several books, including Not the Way It's Supposed to Be (Eerdmans, 1995), the Christianity Today "Book of the Year" in 1996 and Engaging God's World (Eerdmans, 2002), a Christianity Today "Book of the Year" in 2003.

He taught systematic theology at Calvin Seminary from 1979 to 1996. He became Dean of the Chapel at Calvin College in 1996 and was President of Calvin Seminary from 2002 to 2011. He is currently Senior Research Fellow at the Calvin Institute of Christian Worship, Calvin University.

References

1946 births
American Calvinist and Reformed theologians
Calvin University alumni
American people of Dutch descent
Living people
American members of the Christian Reformed Church in North America
Presidents of Calvinist and Reformed seminaries
Princeton Theological Seminary alumni
20th-century Calvinist and Reformed theologians
People from Jamestown, North Dakota